Rashed Al-Raheeb is a Saudi Arabian footballer who currently plays for Al-Jubail. Al-Raheeb is a right back , more specifically he is a full-back that prefers to play on the right side.

References

Living people
1984 births
People from Dammam
Saudi Arabian Shia Muslims
Ettifaq FC players
Ittihad FC players
Hajer FC players
Khaleej FC players
Jeddah Club players
Al-Ain FC (Saudi Arabia) players
Ohod Club players
Al-Tai FC players
Al-Bukayriyah FC players
Al-Jubail Club players
Saudi Professional League players
Saudi First Division League players
Saudi Second Division players
Saudi Third Division players
Association football fullbacks
Saudi Arabian footballers
Saudi Arabia international footballers